Robert Maclin Lively (January 6, 1855 – January 15, 1929) was a U.S. Representative from Texas.

Born in Fayetteville, Washington County, Arkansas, Lively moved to Texas in 1864 with his parents, who settled in Smith County.
He attended private schools in eastern Texas.
He studied law.
He was admitted to the bar in 1876 and commenced practice in Kaufman, Texas.
He moved to Canton, Van Zandt County, and continued the practice of law.
He served as prosecuting attorney of Van Zandt County 1882-1884.

Lively was elected as a Democrat to the Sixty-first Congress to fill the vacancy caused by the resignation of Gordon J. Russell and served from July 23, 1910, to March 3, 1911.
He declined to be a candidate for renomination in 1910.
He served as judge of Van Zandt County, Texas from 1916 to 1918.
He died in Canton, Texas, January 15, 1929.
He was interred in Canton Cemetery.

Sources

 
 
 

1855 births
1929 deaths
Democratic Party members of the United States House of Representatives from Texas
Politicians from Fayetteville, Arkansas
People from Smith County, Texas
People from Canton, Texas
People from Kaufman, Texas